The Jack Adams Award is awarded annually to the National Hockey League (NHL) coach "adjudged to have contributed the most to his team's success." The league's Coach of the Year award has been presented 47 times to 39 coaches. The winner is selected by a poll of the National Hockey League Broadcasters Association at the end of the regular season. Five coaches have won the award twice, while Pat Burns has won three times, the most of any coach. The award is named in honour of Jack Adams, Hall of Fame player for the Toronto Arenas/St. Patricks, Vancouver Millionaires and original Ottawa Senators, and long-time Coach and General Manager of the Detroit Red Wings. It was first awarded at the conclusion of the  regular season.

Jacques Demers is the only coach to win the award in consecutive seasons. Five coaches have won the award with two teams: Jacques Lemaire, Pat Quinn, Scotty Bowman, Barry Trotz, and John Tortorella have won the award twice, while Pat Burns is the only coach to win three times. The franchises with the most Jack Adams Award winners are the Philadelphia Flyers, Detroit Red Wings, Boston Bruins and Phoenix Coyotes with four winners each, although the Coyotes had two winners in Winnipeg before they moved to Arizona. Bill Barber, Bruce Boudreau and Ken Hitchcock are the only coaches to win the award after replacing the head coach who started the season. Barber took over for Craig Ramsay during the Flyers' 2000–01 season, Boudreau replaced Glen Hanlon a month into the Capitals' 2007–08 season while Hitchcock replaced Davis Payne a month into the Blues' 2011–12 season.


Winners
Key

See also
List of National Hockey League awards
List of NHL head coaches

References

External links

National Hockey League trophies and awards

Ice hockey coach of the year awards
Awards established in 1974